Pan Pan (born 27 April 1986) is a retired Chinese professional badminton player. With her partner Tian Qing, they managed to reach the fifth position in the world rankings. She retired in 2012 to be an assistant coach in Chinese Badminton Association. She married Xu Chen in mid-2011.

Achievements

Asian Championships 
Women's doubles

Mixed doubles

Summer Universiade 
Women's doubles

World Junior Championships 
Girls' doubles

Asian Junior Championships 
Girls' doubles

Mixed doubles

BWF Superseries 
The BWF Superseries, launched on 14 December 2006 and implemented in 2007, is a series of elite badminton tournaments, sanctioned by Badminton World Federation (BWF). BWF Superseries has two level such as Superseries and Superseries Premier. A season of Superseries features twelve tournaments around the world, which introduced since 2011, with successful players invited to the Superseries Finals held at the year end.

Women's doubles

 BWF Superseries Finals tournament
 BWF Superseries Premier tournament
 BWF Superseries tournament

BWF Grand Prix 
The BWF Grand Prix has two levels: Grand Prix and Grand Prix Gold. It is a series of badminton tournaments, sanctioned by Badminton World Federation (BWF) since 2007.

Women's doubles

 BWF Grand Prix Gold tournament
 BWF Grand Prix tournament

BWF International Challenge/Series 
Women's doubles

Mixed doubles

 BWF International Challenge tournament
 BWF International Series tournament

References

External links 
 

1986 births
Living people
Badminton players from Hebei
Chinese female badminton players
Sportspeople from Shijiazhuang
Universiade medalists in badminton
Universiade silver medalists for China
Medalists at the 2007 Summer Universiade
21st-century Chinese women